The 1925–26 Allsvenskan, part of the 1925–26 Swedish football season, was the second Allsvenskan season played. The first match was played 2 August 1925 and the last match was played 6 June 1926. Örgryte IS won the league ahead of runners-up GAIS, while IFK Malmö and IK City were relegated.

Participating clubs

League table

Promotions, relegations and qualifications

Results

Attendances

Top scorers

References 

Print

Online

Allsvenskan seasons
1925–26 in Swedish association football leagues
Sweden